MP Da Last Don is the seventh studio album by American rapper Master P. It was released by No Limit Records, Priority Records and EMI. It originally debuted at number 112 on the Billboard Top 200 chart as several stores sold the album before its official release, but then it peaked at number one on the Billboard Top 200 chart, selling 495,000 copies in the first official week. It gained mixed reviews. It was also released about the same time as the straight-to-video short film, MP Da Last Don. It was promoted as his final studio album, although Master P returned to solo recording with Only God Can Judge Me in 1999. The album was certified 4× Platinum by the RIAA with over four million copies sold, making it the best-selling album of Master P's career. It features guest appearances by Bone Thugs-n-Harmony, E-40, Silkk the Shocker, UGK, Snoop Dogg and Soulja Slim.

Background
The album was originally marketed as his retirement album, but he returned a year later with his eighth album, Only God Can Judge Me. It sold four million copies in the U.S. make it one of the best selling albums of his career. The movie, MP Da Last Don, was released on DVD on December 31, 1998.

Track listing

Samples
"Black and White"
"A Love of Your Own" by Average White Band
"Da Last Don"
"Smooth Criminal" by Michael Jackson
"Gangsta B****"
"Love Hangover" by Diana Ross
"Ghetto Love"
"Portrait of Tracy" by Jaco Pastorius
"Rock-a-bye Haters"
"Rock-a-bye Baby" by Traditional Folk
"Snitches"
"Haboglabotribin'" by Bernard Wright
"Thinkin' Bout U"
"Thinkin' About Ya" by Timex Social Club
"Thug Girl"
"Dumb Girl" by Run-DMC
"Criminal Minded" by Boogie Down Productions

Charts

Weekly charts

Year-end charts

Singles
Goodbye To my Homies

Hot Boys and Girls

See also
List of number-one albums of 1998 (U.S.)
List of number-one R&B albums of 1998 (U.S.)

References

External links
   Official Track Listing

Master P albums
1998 albums
Priority Records albums
No Limit Records albums